Carol Willette Bachofner is an American poet of Abenaki descent. She currently resides in Rockland, Maine. She is the co-founder and editor of the online literary journal, Pulse, established in 1997. She has also published several collections of her own poetry, including Native Moons, Native Days, as well as Drink from Your Own Wells: a guide to richer writing.

Career 
She has been nominated for several literary awards and honors, including Editor of the Year by the Wordcraft Circle of Writers & Storytellers in 1999 and Writer of the Year for her poetry by that same group in 2000.
 
In April 2012, she was named Rockland Poet Laureate  by the City of Rockland, Maine.

Publications 

Poetry Collections

Daughter of the Ardennes Forest: Poems. Charlotte, NC: Main Street Rag Pub., 2007. Print. , .
Breakfast at the Brass Compass: poems of Mid Coast Maine. Rockland, ME: Heartsounds, 2009. Print. , .
I Write in the Greenhouse: Poems. Rockland, ME: Front Porch Editions, 2011. Print. , .
Native Moons, Native Days: Poems. Greenfield Center, NY: Bowman, 2012. Print. , 

Individual Publications

All sorts, Amtrak Dawn: Seattle to Vancouver, BC.
Nocturne, and: After Your Divorce.

References

External links 
 The Comstock Review. Accessed 2013-04-02
 Heartsounds Press. Accessed 2013-04-03
 Main Street Rag Magazine. Accessed 2013-04-02
 Maine State Library Archive. Accessed 2013-04-02
 Dacus, Rachel. Fringe Magazine. Accessed 2013-04-04
 Rock City Poet Blog. Accessed 2013-04-01
 YouTube. Three Poets Book Launch, Camden Library. Accessed 2013-03-27.

Living people
People from Rockland, Maine
Vermont College of Fine Arts alumni
American women poets
Year of birth missing (living people)
21st-century American women